Naveed Nour (born 1963) is a contemporary artist who uses photography as the basis of his work. Born in Cologne, Germany to Iranian parents. His work focuses on conflict and culture.

Personal life
Nour was born in Germany to Iranian parents. He currently resides in Boston, Massachusetts, USA.

Career
In the early 1980s Nour documented the Iran–Iraq War while focusing on the social effects of war on society. His work of this period became the core of his "History Recalls" project. While most of his work is based on traditional street photography until 2006 as seen in his Momento series, which was mostly in black and white, he later changed to color photography and started to focus on conceptual themes such as in his Movements in Adagio series. In April 2009 his work 12 Panels of Life in Gozo was shown at the Armenian Library and Museum of America.  This work focused on the culture of conflict in Victoria, the capital of Gozo in Malta.  It was a collaboration between Nour and Norbert Francis Attard.  This exhibit was titled Here, There and Everywhere: Anticipating the Art of the Future and was juried by the Transcultural Exchange.  The purpose of the project was to encourage artists to work with others in different parts of the world to create collaborative artworks and to explore, foster and document the resulting cross-fertilization, multi-disciplinary, "out-of-the-box" thinking in order to encourage more of the same in both artistic and non-artistic disciplines.

Catalogue(s) 
 ArtCetera 2006
 Waterhouse & Dodd "Routes" – London 2008
 ArtCetera 2008

References

External links 
 The Huntington News, January 10, 2007 – “The Art of War” by Julie Balise
 Boston Globe, July 5, 2007 – “Rediscovering the Viewfinder” by Denise Taylor
 Boston Globe,October 23, 2007 – “Soul Train” by Luke O’Neil (article expired online)
 Griffin Museum of Photography
 Naveed Nour's website
 PhotoEmerge

1963 births
Living people
Iranian emigrants to the United States
Massachusetts College of Art and Design faculty
University of Tehran alumni
Iranian photographers
German people of Iranian descent
University of Ottawa alumni
Cambridge College alumni